Carlsbad State Beach is a protected beach in the state park system of California, United States, located in Carlsbad.  It is a San Diego County beach with coastal bluffs. Popular activities include swimming, surfing and bodyboarding several nearby breaks, scuba diving, fishing, and beachcombing.  Many visitors camp on the campsites on top of the cliffs.  Access to the beach is through the multiple staircases and also one ramp. Amenities include showers, bathrooms, electricity, water, Wi-Fi, and a camp store. There are 220 campsites total.  The  park was established in 1933.

See also
List of beaches in California
List of California state parks
List of California State Beaches

References

External links
Carlsbad State Beach

1933 establishments in California
Beaches of Southern California
California State Beaches
Carlsbad, California
Parks in San Diego County, California
Protected areas established in 1933
Beaches of San Diego County, California